Gmina Dobra may refer to any of the following administrative districts in Poland:
Gmina Dobra, Lesser Poland Voivodeship
Gmina Dobra, Łobez County
Gmina Dobra, Police County
Gmina Dobra, Greater Poland Voivodeship